Tadeusz Janczar (25 April 1926 – 31 October 1997) was a Polish film actor. He appeared in 26 films between 1952 and 1983.

Partial filmography

 Zaloga (1952) - Brzozowski
 Zolnierz zwyciestwa (1953) - Franek
 Five Boys from Barska Street (1954) - Kazek Spokorny
 A Generation (1955) - Jasio Krone
 Kariera (1955) - Witek
 Kanał (1957) - Ens. Jacek 'Korab'
 Farewells (1958) - Pawel
 Bad Luck (1960) - Ens. Sawicki
 Nafta (1961)
 Jutro premiera (1962) - profesor Roman Witting scenograf
 Dziewczyna z dobrego domu (1962) - Tadeusz Lokietek
 Landscape After the Battle (1970) - Karol
 Znaki na drodze (1970) - Michal Biel
 Prawdzie w oczy (1970) - Bronek Kaczmarski
 Zabijcie czarna owce (1972) - Tymon's Stepfather
 Na krawedzi (1973) - Wojtek
 Z tamtej strony teczy (1973) - Malarz, byly partner Teresy
 Hubal (1973) - Capt. Maciej 'Kotwicz' Kalenkiewicz
 Nie bede cie kochac (1974)
 Opowiesc w czerwieni (1974) - Cpt. Paszkowski
 Romans Teresy Hennert (1978) - Professor Laterna
 Zamach stanu (1981) - Wojciech Korfanty
 Nic nie stoi na przeszkodzie (1981) - Jerzy
 W obronie wlasnej (1982) - Jerzy
 Epitafium dla Barbary Radziwiłłówny (1983) - Samuel Maciejowski

References

External links

1926 births
1997 deaths
Male actors from Warsaw
People from Warsaw Voivodeship (1919–1939)
Polish male film actors
Polish male stage actors
20th-century Polish male actors
Burials at Powązki Cemetery
Recipient of the Meritorious Activist of Culture badge